Puppis is a constellation in the southern sky. Puppis, the Latin translation of "poop deck", was originally part of an over-large constellation Argo Navis (the ship of Jason and the Argonauts), which centuries after its initial description, was divided into three parts, the other two being Carina (the keel and hull), and Vela (the sails of the ship). Puppis is the largest of the three constellations in square degrees. It is one of the 88 modern constellations recognized by the International Astronomical Union.

Features

Argo Navis was sub-divided into three sections in 1752 by the French astronomer Nicolas Louis de Lacaille, including Argûs in puppi. Despite the division, Lacaille kept a single set of Bayer designations for the whole constellation, Argo. Therefore, Carina has the α, β, and ε, Vela has γ and δ, Puppis has ζ, and so on. In the 19th century, these three sections of Argo became established as separate constellations and were formally included in the list of 88 modern IAU constellations in 1930.

Named stars

Planetary systems
Several extrasolar planet systems have been found around stars in the constellation Puppis, including:
 On July 1, 2003, a planet was found orbiting the star HD 70642. This planetary system is much like Jupiter with a wide, circular orbit and a long-period.
 On May 17, 2006, HD 69830 (the nearest star of this constellation) was discovered to have three Neptune-mass planets, the first multi-planetary system without any Jupiter-like or Saturn-like planets. The star also hosts an asteroid belt at the region between middle planet to outer planet.
 On June 21, 2007, the first extrasolar planet found in the open cluster NGC 2423, was discovered around the red giant star NGC 2423-3. The planet is at least 10.6 times the mass of Jupiter and orbits at 2.1 AU distance.
 On September 22, 2008, two Jupiter-like planets were discovered around HD 60532.

Deep-sky objects

As the Milky Way runs through Puppis, there are many open clusters in the constellation. M46 and M47 are two open clusters in the same binocular field. M47 can be seen with the naked eye under dark skies, and its brightest stars are 6th magnitude. Messier 93 (M93) is another open cluster somewhat to the south. NGC 2451 is a very bright open cluster containing the star c Puppis, and the near NGC 2477 is a good target for small telescopes. The star Pi Puppis is the main component of a bright group of stars known as Collinder 135.

M46 is a circular open cluster with an overall magnitude of 6.1 at a distance of approximately 5400 light-years from Earth. The planetary nebula NGC 2438 is superimposed; it is approximately 2900 light-years from Earth. M46 is classified as a Shapley class f and a Trumpler class III 2 m cluster. This means that it is a rich cluster that appears distinct from the star field. However, it is not at its center. The cluster's stars, numbering between 50 and 100, have a moderate range in brightness.

See also
Puppis (Chinese astronomy)

References

Sources
 
 Ian Ridpath and Wil Tirion (2017). Stars and Planets Guide, Collins, London. . Princeton University Press, Princeton. .
 Richard Hinckley Allen, Star Names, Their Lore and Legend, New York, Dover.

External links

 The Deep Photographic Guide to the Constellations: Puppis
 The clickable Puppis
 Star Tales – Puppis

 
Constellations
Southern constellations
Constellations listed by Lacaille